Bodgaya may refer to:

 Bodh Gaya, a city in India
 Bodgaya Island, an island in Malaysia